Petrolhead is the third studio album by Australian musician Ian Moss. The album was a departure from Ian's previous albums with Moss saying “it was a conscious decision to get back to something I was always happy doing. The result is tough, ballsy blues meets rock...plenty of heart, alive and kicking.”

Reception
Australian musicologist Ian McFarlane declared it was "his best-ever album ... [by] a down'n'dirty blues-rock outfit ... with gritty, hard-edged tracks ... [and] finely honed guitar work".

The Sydney Morning Herald said, "The irony of Petrolhead is while many of the songs seem forgettable on first listen, they are annoyingly difficult to forget. Just about everything is unoriginal, but is also done with enthusiasm and guitars turned up to 11."

Track listing

Personnel
Ian Moss - Vocals, Guitar
Ian Rilen - Bass
Paul DeMarco - Drums
Don Walker - Keyboards, Producer
Trent Williamson - Harmonica
Shauna Jensen - Backing Vocals
Maggie McKinney - Backing Vocals
Jerome Smith - Backing Vocals

Charts

References

1996 albums
Ian Moss albums